Newton-by-Tattenhall is a former civil parish, now in the parishes of Tattenhall and District and Hargrave and Huxley, in Cheshire West and Chester, Cheshire, England.  It contains two buildings that are recorded in the National Heritage List for England as designated listed buildings, both of which are at Grade II.  This grade is the lowest of the three gradings given to listed buildings and is applied to "buildings of national importance and special interest".  The parish is entirely rural, and the listed buildings consist of a former watermill and a canal bridge.

References

Listed buildings in Cheshire West and Chester
Lists of listed buildings in Cheshire